Ernesto Rossi (25 August 1897 – 9 February 1967) was an Italian politician, journalist and anti-fascist activist. His ideas contributed to the Partito d'Azione, and subsequently the Partito Radicale. He was co-author of the Ventotene Manifesto.

Rossi was born in Caserta. Not yet nineteen years old, he voluntarily enlisted and fought in World War I. After the war, moved by opposition to the socialists' attitude of hostility towards war veterans and their sacrifices and by contempt of the incapable political class of bounding idealists, he approached the nationalists of the People of Italy (directed by Benito Mussolini), a newspaper with which he collaborated from 1919 to 1922.

During that time, however, he met Gaetano Salvemini, with whom he formed a long-lasting bond of respect and friendship, and he moved definitively and radically further from the positions that were bringing to the fascist ideology.

He died in Rome in 1967.

Bibliography

External links
Ernesto Rossi biography (Italian)
 The archival holding of Ernesto Rossi was deposited to Historical Archives of EU of Florence (Italy) and the inventory is online.
The words of Ventotene, documentary about Ernesto Rossi and his contribution to the Manifesto of Ventotene

1897 births
1967 deaths
People from Caserta
Action Party (Italy) politicians
Radical Party (Italy) politicians
Politicians of Campania
Italian military personnel of World War I
Members of Giustizia e Libertà
20th-century Italian politicians